SW Andromedae is a variable star in the constellation of Andromeda.  It is classified as an RR Lyrae star, and varies from an apparent magnitude of 10.09 at minimum brightness to a magnitude of 9.14 at maximum brightness with a period of 0.44226 days.

Notes

References

Andromeda (constellation)
RR Lyrae variables
Andromedae, SU
A-type giants
001878
Durchmusterung objects